Donald Johnson and Jared Palmer were the defending champions but were eliminated in the round robin.

Jacco Eltingh and Paul Haarhuis defeated Jonas Björkman and Todd Woodbridge in the final, 3–6, 6–3, [13–11], to win the gentlemen's invitation doubles tennis title at the 2011 Wimbledon Championships.

Draw

Final

Group A
Standings are determined by: 1. number of wins; 2. number of matches; 3. in two-players-ties, head-to-head records; 4. in three-players-ties, percentage of sets won, or of games won; 5. steering-committee decision.

Group B
Standings are determined by: 1. number of wins; 2. number of matches; 3. in two-players-ties, head-to-head records; 4. in three-players-ties, percentage of sets won, or of games won; 5. steering-committee decision.

External links
Draw

Men's Invitation Doubles